Xile Hu (born 1978 in Putian, China) is a Swiss chemist specialized in catalysis. He is a professor in chemistry at EPFL (École Polytechnique Fédérale de Lausanne) and leads the Laboratory of Inorganic Synthesis and Catalysis at the School of Basic Sciences.

Career 
Hu studied chemistry at Peking University and received his Bachelor’s degree in 2000. During his undergraduate, he worked with Jianhua Lin. He then joined the lab of Karsten Meyer at University of California, San Diego as PhD student and graduated with a thesis on "Metal complexes of tripodal N-heterocyclic carbene ligands: synthesis, structure, bonding, and reactivity." In 2005, he went to work as postdoctoral researcher with Jonas C. Peters at the California Institute of Technology. Here he initiated and developed a research project on molecular electrocatalysts for hydrogen evolution.

In 2007, he became Assistant Professor of chemistry at EPFL. In 2013, he was promoted as Associate Professor, and in 2016, he became Full Professor at EPFL. Since 2007 he has led the Laboratory of Inorganic Synthesis and Catalysis at EPFL's School of Basic Sciences.

Research 
Hu's research group directs an interdisciplinary research program to develop catalysis for sustainable synthesis of added-value chemicals and for cost-effective production of solar fuels. They aim at the development of catalysts that are made of Earth-abundant elements and that enable the chemical transformations important in synthesis, energy, and sustainability. They focus on base metal catalyzed organic synthesis, electrochemical water splitting, CO2 reduction, fuel cell catalysis, and the development of synthetic models for the active site of metalloenzymes.

Distinctions 
In 2011, Hu won the Werner prize of the Swiss Chemical Society. In 2012 he was selected as an extraordinary young scientist by the world economic forum. In 2013, he received the Chemical Society Reviews Emerging Investigator Lectureship. In 2014, he won the European Medal for Bio-Inorganic Chemistry at the Eurobic conference. In 2015, he received the Young Researcher Award from the European Federation of Catalysis Societies. In 2016, he received the Bau Family Award in Inorganic Chemistry. In 2017, he was awarded with the National Latsis Prize by the Swiss National Science Foundation, the International Latsis Foundation, the Organic Letters Outstanding Publication of the Year Lectureship for 2017, and the Tajima Prize by the International Society of Electrochemistry. In 2018, he received the Resonate Award from Caltech, in 2019, the Homogeneous Catalysis Award by Royal Society of Chemistry, and in 2020, the International Catalysis Award by the International Association of Catalysis Societies. Hu was named "Highly Cited Researcher" by Publons (Clarivate Analytics) for the years 2017, 2018, 2019, and 2020.

In 2014, he became a fellow of the Royal Society of Chemistry (UK), and in 2019 fellow of the European Academy of Sciences. Since 2020 he is a member of the Academia Europaea.

Selected works

References

External links 
 
 Website of the Laboratory of Inorganic Synthesis and Catalysis

Living people
University of California, San Diego alumni
California Institute of Technology alumni
1978 births
Peking University alumni
Academic staff of the École Polytechnique Fédérale de Lausanne
Chinese chemists